Cedarvale Park (originally known as Cedar Vale) is a park located in Toronto, Ontario, Canada. It is bordered by very steep hills, and is located in the Cedarvale neighbourhood of Toronto. The Line 1 Yonge–University subway tunnels underneath it, between St. Clair West and Eglinton West stations; near the Markdale TTC Emergency Exit. The north end of the park contains the Phil White (Cedarvale) Arena and The Leo Baeck Day School, formerly Arlington Middle School. It is commonly used for dog walkers and students returning from the nearby school.  The large open fields are heavily used by the community for everything from cricket games to flying kites. In the winter the large hill is used for tobogganing, many people bring their sleds and enjoy riding down the hills.

South of the fields, the park angles southeast, and becomes more of a deep, naturalized ravine with steep sides, with a heavily used footpath down the middle. Cedarvale ravine contains very sizable wetlands east of Bathurst Street in Forest Hill; the remainder of the natural portion is young regrowth forest (the ravine was largely clearcut during the construction of the Spadina Subway in the 1970s). The path is heavily used and remains passable even in winter, with foot traffic packing snow down despite the lack of plowing, especially after drainage works in 2006 fixed water pooling and subsequent ice buildup.

The park benefits from its proximity to the Beltline trail in the north and the Nordheimer Ravine to the south; these join together to form a large trail system through midtown Toronto.

At the south end of the park, right by the St.Clair West subway entrance, there is an outdoor exercise area with pull-up bars, dip bars and benches of various heights. A great place for a street workout, the park was built by Montreal company Trekfit (trekfit.ca), which has several of these pads around the city.

History 
A creek, Castle Frank Brook, used to run through Cedarvale Park, but it is now completely buried. Ernest Hemingway, an American novelist, often frequented this park's path, which was then used as a cattle path, during his stay in Canada. There were plans in the 1920s and the 1930s to build mansions in the ravine, but the Great Depression in the 1930s halted its construction. The Glen Cedar bridge that spans the ravine portion of the park was built during that time and restored in 1989, after being rescued from demolition. In the 1960s and 1970s, there were plans to build the Spadina Expressway through Cedarvale Park but Jane Jacobs successfully lobbied against the government to halt its construction project. Cedarvale Park is located on the right-of-way for the cancelled Spadina Expressway south of Eglinton that was transferred to the province of Ontario in return for the building of Black Creek Drive.

Since the 2000s, increasing ecological awareness has changed priorities within the park, with renaturalization projects already underway on slopes near the north end of the park.

Cedarvale Ravine has a permanent off-leash area for dogs, but leashes are required in all other areas. Following a string of dog attacks in Cedarvale Ravine, the park is now frequented by bylaw officers who will ticket the owners of off-leash dogs outside the designated area.

References

External links
Friend of Cedarvale Park

Parks in Toronto